Timor Steffens (Roermond, 9 October 1987) is a Dutch dancer.

Biography 
Steffens was born in Roermond, Netherlands. At the age of six he moved to Rotterdam. He took both a hairdressing course and an electrical engineering course, but he did not finish either. At eighteen he started dancing and a year later he was accepted at the Codarts. In 2008 he participated in the talent show So You Think You Can Dance. He finished second, behind winner Ivan Paulovich. The American choreographer Dan Karaty, however, was 'very enthusiastic' about Steffens. Thus, two months after the final, he left for the United States, like the winner. In Los Angeles he built up a network of contacts in order to generate more fame.

In May 2009, Steffens obtained a work visa for the United States, allowing him to work in the country until 2011. This was due to a 'big assignment' that he had won. Four days later it was announced that he would be dancing with singer Michael Jackson during his This is it concert series in London that would last from July 2009 to March 2010. However, Jackson died prematurely on June 25, so the concert series never occurred. Steffens said he was "shocked" by Jackson's death. On July 7, 2009, Steffens danced with the other backing dancers at Jackson's memorial service, which was broadcast live worldwide. He also attended Jackson's funeral on September 3, 2009. On October 28, 2009, the film Michael Jackson's This Is It was released, in which Steffens could be seen as a background dancer during the rehearsals.

In the spring of 2010, Steffens collaborated with Jermaine Jackson on the SBS6 program Move Like Michael Jackson. That same year he danced as a background dancer in the film Burlesque and became the face of the shoe store PRO for six months.

Steffens became a member of singer Chris Brown 's dance company in 2011. He performed with the singer and can also appeared in Brown's music videos. In the fall of 2012, he appeared as a jury member for the dance and movement category as part of the RTL 4 program . In May 2014, Steffens became the creative director of The Voice of Italy. Since September 2015, Steffens has been a jury member in on RTL 4's .

In 2018, Steffens became the "ambassador" for the Dutch distributor of Suzuki motorcycles.

Private life 
In 2014, Steffens had a brief fling with Madonna.

Steffens was in a three-year relationship with model Zoey Ivory. They broke up in May 2021.

Filmography

Films

Television

References

External links 
 
 

Dutch male dancers
Entertainers from Rotterdam
People from Roermond
1987 births
Living people